This is a list of women who held the title Princess of Asturias by marriage.

The title was created in 1388 for the future Henry III of Castile and Catherine of Lancaster. A part of the pact ("Accord of Bayonne") was to grant the young couple the title of Prince and Princess of Asturias, which was modelled after that of Prince of Wales in the Kingdom of England. The title was to belong to the official successor of the Castilian throne. Thus the first holder of the princedom was the young Henry of Castile and the first woman to hold the title by marriage was his wife, Catherine of Lancaster.

Leonor, Princess of Asturias, elder daughter of King Felipe VI of Spain, holds the title in her own right, and not by marriage, as she is the heir presumptive to the Spanish crown.

Princess of Asturias

This is a list of Princesses of Asturias who held the title by their marriage to the Prince of Asturias:

See also
List of Asturian consorts
Princess of Girona
Princess of Viana
Duchess of Montblanc
Countess of Cervera
Duchess of Calabria

References

 
Asturias
Asturias